Leipzig–Altenburg Airport ;  (known as Altenburg–Nobitz Airport until February 2008) is a German regional airport in Nobitz,  southeast of Altenburg and  south of Leipzig in the state of Thuringia. It was the second largest airport in Thuringia after Erfurt-Weimar Airport when it had scheduled traffic. In 2007, it served almost 140,000 passengers. All scheduled services ceased in 2011.

History

Early years
The airfield at Altenburg–Nobitz is one of the oldest in Germany. Its origins can be traced back as far as 1868, when the area the airfield now occupies was first used as an infantry drill ground. In 1881, Duke Ernst II of Sachsen-Altenburg agreed to further expansion of the site for military purposes, and in 1909 a visit was made by an early airship; the Duke was given a flight in it, and immediately became an enthusiastic convert to aviation. Two years later, in 1911, an airship display was held at the site, which also included flights by early heavier-than-air biplanes, and in June 1913 the airfield was officially established.

During World War I, Altenburg–Nobitz was mainly used as a production centre for German military aircraft, with Albatros, DFW, Rumpler and Fokker types all being assembled there.  A military flying school was also located on the airfield.

Following the defeat of Germany, the airfield infrastructure was dismantled in accordance with the provisions of the Treaty of Versailles. The site lay derelict until the 1930s, but after the Nazi Party came to power a decision was made to reactivate Altenburg–Nobitz as part of German rearmament plans.  Work on this began in 1936; new hangars, workshops and barracks were built, and a concrete runway laid.

During World War II, the relative remoteness of Altenburg–Nobitz from the main theatres of war made the airfield an obvious location for Luftwaffe flying training in various forms. Basic flying training was carried out, as was more advanced blind-flying and instrument training. Several types of aircraft were employed for the latter, among them the Junkers Ju 87, Junkers Ju 88, Heinkel He 111, Dornier Do 17 and Messerschmitt Bf 110. The airfield was also the base for a conversion unit for the Focke-Wulf Fw 190, using a special two-seat variant of this successful fighter.

Development after World War II

With the collapse of the Reich, the airfield was captured by the US Army in April 1945, being subsequently handed over to the Soviets in July, when the area came under Soviet control, following the post-war territorial settlement between the Allies. From then until 1992 Altenburg–Nobitz was used as a fighter base by the Soviet Air Force. Successive types of MiG fighters were based there, principally the MiG-21 and later the MiG-29. The camouflaged individual blister hangars that were built for these fighters can still be seen dotted around the airfield perimeter. An anti-aircraft missile system was also installed there in 1986.

The Soviet presence on the airfield ended in 1992 with the collapse of communism and the radical redrawing of the political landscape which ensued. Following German Reunification, the airfield was converted to civilian use as a regional airport. For some years, Ryanair operated services to and from the UK and Spain, but these were discontinued in April 2011. Leipzig–Altenburg (as the airfield is now known) is today mainly used by general aviation and corporate aircraft. There is also a small aviation museum which chronicles the history of the airfield. Two aircraft are currently on display there: an ex-Soviet Air Force MiG-21, and an ex-Luftwaffe Breguet 'Atlantique' maritime patrol aircraft.

Airlines and destinations
There have been no scheduled services to and from Leipzig–Altenburg since Ryanair ended flights  in 2011. The nearest international airports are Erfurt–Weimar Airport and Leipzig/Halle Airport.

Statistics

Accidents and incidents
 On March 10, 2010, a Ryanair Boeing 737-800, originating from London–Stansted, on approach to Altenburg could not establish radio contact with the tower and had to divert to Schönefeld Airport in Berlin. It was later discovered that, due to a scheduling misunderstanding, the air traffic controller scheduled had not shown up to work.

See also
 Transport in Germany
 List of airports in Germany

References

External links

 Official website 
 Official website of the airport museum

Altenburg
Airports established in 1913
Buildings and structures in Thuringia
Military facilities of the Soviet Union in Germany
Altenburg
1913 establishments in Germany